Methodist Homes (MHA) is the largest charity care provider in the UK. The charity's missions is to inspire the best care and wellbeing at every stage of later life.

Through 88 specialist care homes, 69 thriving retirement living and 45 vibrant community groups and befriending, MHA aim to enable older people to live later life well.

MHA was established as an independent charity by the Methodist Church in 1943 and was formerly known as Methodist Homes for the Aged. Whilst MHA is open to providing care and support to people of all faiths and none, the charity continue to have strong support from Methodists as well as other Christians to this day.

MHA's head office is based in Derby, with award-winning residential, nursing and dementia care homes, retirement housing and community support services provided across England, Scotland and Wales.

Charitable work
Established in 1943, MHA now delivers a range of services to over 18,500 individuals.

The charity run 88 residential, specialist dementia and nursing care homes, as well as more than 69 thriving retirement living communities and 45 vibrant community groups (formerly Live at Home) for older people who live independently in their own homes. The community groups aim to tackle loneliness and isolation among older people.

All donations and any surplus generated is invested into the services MHA provide for 18,500 residents and members.

MHA serves approximately 10,500 older people supported through 45 Community services in the community and online, 3,000 older people living independently in 69 retirement living communities with flexible support and personalised care, with a further seven sites in development, and 5,000 older people living in 88 care homes.

Their services are provided by 7,000 staff supported by 4,000 volunteers.

References

External links
 
Official MHA fundraising website 
 Charity Commission website

Charities for the elderly based in the United Kingdom
Housing for the elderly in the United Kingdom
Housing associations based in England
Methodism in the United Kingdom
1943 establishments in England